Melville W. Brown (March 10, 1887 – January 31, 1938) was an American film director, screenwriter and occasional actor.  He began his career on the local stage in Oregon, in stock companies and vaudeville, before moving to California and working in the silent film industry in 1916, at the suggestion of Charlie Chaplin.  His career was cut short when he died of a heart attack in January 1938.

Early life
Brown was born on March 10, 1887, to John and Fannie Brown of Portland, Oregon. He began his career in show business in local vaudeville productions and stock companies, such as the Baker Stock Company in Spokane, Washington.  In 1916, at the suggestion of Charlie Chaplin, he moved to Hollywood to start a film career.

Career
His first known credit is as a screenwriter, on the 1919 silent film, The Pest, produced by Goldwyn Pictures, and directed by Christy Cabanne. Over the next several years he would continue to write screenplays, including the critically acclaimed The Goose Woman, which he adapted from a story by Rex Beach, and directed by Clarence Brown (no relation). He would move into the directing field in 1926, with the film, Her Big Night, which he also wrote the screenplay for.  In 1935, he left Hollywood and went to England, where he directed several films over the next two years, the last of which, Mad About Money, was released after his death. Over the course of his career, he would write or direct over 30 films in Hollywood and the United Kingdom.

He returned from England in late 1937, and was working on a screenplay when he was stricken by a heart attack and died on January 31, 1938, at the age of 50.

Filmography

References

External links

Silent film directors
American male screenwriters
1887 births
1938 deaths
Writers from Portland, Oregon
Film directors from Oregon
Male actors from Portland, Oregon
Screenwriters from Oregon
Silent film screenwriters
20th-century American male writers
20th-century American screenwriters